The 1987–88 Quebec Nordiques season was the Nordiques ninth season in the National Hockey League.

Offseason
Quebec made a huge trade during the 1987 NHL Entry Draft, as the Nordiques traded away Dale Hunter and Clint Malarchuk to the Washington Capitals for Gaetan Duchesne, Alan Haworth, and the Capitals first round draft pick in the 1987 NHL Entry Draft, in which the Nordiques selected Joe Sakic.  Haworth had an injury plagued season in 1986–87, appearing in only 50 games, however, he scored 25 goals and 41 points.  In 1985–86, Haworth had a career high 34 goals and 73 points for the Capitals.  Duchesne had a career high 52 points with Washington in 1986–87, as he scored 17 goals and had 35 assists.  Joe Sakic was the Nordiques second selection in the 1987 NHL Entry Draft, as he scored 60 goals and 133 points in 72 games with the Swift Current Broncos of the Western Hockey League (WHL), as Quebec selected Bryan Fogarty with their first pick.  Fogarty had 70 points in 56 games with the Kingston Canadians of the Ontario Hockey League (OHL).

Head coach Michel Bergeron left the Nordiques to take the head coaching job with the New York Rangers.  As compensation, the Nordiques received the New York Rangers first round pick in the 1988 NHL Entry Draft.  Quebec hired former Nordiques player Andre Savard to replace Bergeron.  Savard ended his twelve-year playing career by playing his last two seasons with Quebec from 1983 to 1985.  He had been the head coach of the Fredericton Express of the AHL.

Late in the pre-season, the Nordiques made a trade with the New York Rangers, when Quebec sent David Shaw and John Ogrodnick to the Rangers for Terry Carkner and Jeff Jackson.  Carkner had a solid rookie season with New York in 1986–87, scoring two goals and 15 points in 52 games with the Rangers, while Jackson split the season between the Toronto Maple Leafs and the Rangers, scoring 13 goals and 21 points in 64 games between the two teams.

Regular season
Quebec began the season with a three-game winning streak, and continued their early season success, as they had a 9–5–1 record through their first 15 games.  The Nordiques then lost eight of their next nine games, to fall to 10–13–1--a slump which cost head coach Andre Savard his job.  He was replaced by assistant coach Ron Lapointe on an interim basis for the remainder of the season.  Under Lapointe, the Nordiques would go 6–3–1 in his first ten games to reach the .500 level with a 16–16–2 record, and found themselves in a fight with the Buffalo Sabres and Hartford Whalers for the final two playoff spots in the Adams Division.  Quebec would remain in the hunt, as after 72 games, the team had a 32–36–4 record, good for 68 points, and a three-point lead on the Whalers for the final playoff spot.  Quebec then went winless in their last eight games, going 0–7–1, as the Nordiques sank to last place in the Adams Division, missing the playoffs for the first time since their inaugural season in 1979–80.  Their record was 32–43–5, earning 69 points, which was their worst record since 1979–80, when the Nordiques were 25–44–11, getting 61 points.

On offence, the club was led by Peter Stastny, who recorded 111 points, which was good for a tie for fifth place in the National Hockey League (NHL).  Stastny scored 46 goals, his highest total since 1983–84, while adding 65 assists.  Michel Goulet once again led the club in goals, as he scored 48 times, while he added 58 assists for 106 points.  Anton Stastny was solid once again, getting 27 goals and 72 points, while newcomers Gaetan Duchesne and Alan Haworth each cracked the 20 goal plateau, scoring 24 and 23 goals respectively.

Jeff Brown led the Nordiques from the blueline, scoring 16 goals and 52 points, while Terry Carkner chipped in with 27 points in his first season in Quebec.

In goal, Mario Gosselin appeared in 54 games, winning a team high 20 games, while posting a 3.78 GAA, and recording two shutouts for the team.  Rookie Mario Brunetta was the backup, winning 10 games with a 3.72 GAA in 29 games.  Another rookie, Ron Tugnutt, appeared in six games, earning two wins with a 3.38 GAA.

Final standings

Schedule and results

Player statistics

Awards
 Second NHL All-Star team: Michel Goulet

Transactions
The Nordiques were involved in the following transactions during the 1987–88 season.

Trades

Waivers

Free agents

Draft picks
Quebec's draft picks from the 1987 NHL Entry Draft which was held at Joe Louis Arena in Detroit, Michigan.

Farm teams
 Fredericton Express - AHL

See also
1987–88 NHL season

References

External links

Quebec Nordiques season, 1987-88
Quebec Nordiques seasons
Que